TV.com was a website owned by Red Ventures that covered television series and episodes with a focus on English-language shows made or broadcast in Australia, Canada, Ireland, Japan, New Zealand, the United States, and the United Kingdom. Originally launched by CNET in the mid-1990s, the website was transformed in 2005 when CNET acquired the website TV Tome and incorporated its assets into the new website's composition. CNET Networks, including the TV.com site, would later be purchased by CBS in 2008. In its heyday, TV.com emphasized user-generated content listings for a wide variety of programs that included episode air dates, descriptions, news, season listings, notes, credits, trivia, and a forum section.

Although TV.com was successful as an information website in the late 2000s, it went without regular updates beginning in 2019. Around July 2021, the TV.com website was quietly shut down with no redirect put in its place.

History
CNET originally acquired the domain name (among other generic domain names like news.com, radio.com, etc.) in the mid-1990s to host a website for the company's technology-related TV shows. One of these shows was titled TV.com. The program, highlighting the best of the Internet for new and casual computer users, aired in U.S. syndication, and featured Ron Reagan as a correspondent.

On April 22, 2005, CNET acquired TV Tome, a fan-run television database. TV.com was launched a few months after that acquisition on June 1, 2005. Many of the features and content from the original TV Tome site were maintained in the new TV.com site.

On May 15, 2008, CBS formally announced its purchase of CNET Networks, and the company changed its name to CBS Interactive.

TV.com continually looked at innovating the television viewing experience by incorporating it with technology, as seen with the creation of WatchList. This service offered personalized TV listings influenced by user actions and social media, which eventually carried over to the creation of TV.com Relay.

The news and features pages on TV.com were no longer updated after the spring of 2019, and the website was only accessible on an intermittent basis in 2019. In early 2020, registered users became unable to log in to profile pages, and user posts were removed from forums. As a result, information pertaining to individual programs and series could no longer be edited or updated.

As of July 2021, the site is no longer available on the internet.

TV Tome

TV Tome was an American website devoted to documenting English language television shows and their production. It was run by volunteer editors, with the assistance of user contributions. The site was founded by John Nestoriak III.

The site had over 2,500 complete television series guides, over 3,500 developing television series guides, and filmographies for 250,000 actors and crew members moderated by a five-member crew. In addition to the television series guides, TV Tome had a forum for each television series, with information regarding episodes, their interpretation, and general discussions.

A spin-off site, Movie Tome, was established in August 2003. A video game tome and a music tome were originally planned as well, but such plans were abandoned with the purchase of TV Tome and Movie Tome by CNET.

On April 22, 2005, TV Tome officially announced its acquisition by CNET. CNET reportedly bought TV Tome for US$5 million in January 2005. CNET announced plans to relocate the site to its TV.com domain, which was acquired in 1996 for use in conjunction with the short-lived syndicated television series of the same name. A preliminary version of the new site launched on June 1, 2005, and on June 13, 2005, the site was permanently redirected to TV.com with an entirely new layout.

Relay
TV.com Relay was a social television check-in application that was available via mobile networks and web.

References 

Former CBS Interactive websites
Entertainment Internet forums
Internet properties established in 2005
Internet properties disestablished in 2021
Television websites
English-language websites